Osowa Góra may refer to:
 Osowa Góra (Bydgoszcz district), a district in Bydgoszcz, Poland
Osowa Góra, Kuyavian-Pomeranian Voivodeship, a village in north-central Poland
Osowa Góra, Pomeranian Voivodeship, a village in north Poland